Paratapes is a genus of saltwater clam, a marine bivalve mollusk in the family Veneridae, the Venus clams.

Species
 Paratapes textilis (Gmelin, 1791)
 Paratapes undulatus (Born, 1778)

References

Veneridae
Bivalve genera